Alexis Michiels (19 December 1883 – 2 November 1976) was a cyclist. He competed in two events at the 1912 Summer Olympics representing France. He also rode in the 1919 Tour de France.

References

External links
 

1883 births
1976 deaths
French male cyclists
Belgian male cyclists
Olympic cyclists of France
Cyclists at the 1912 Summer Olympics
Cyclists from Brussels